Patricia O'Lynn (born 28 September 1990) is a Northern Irish academic, educator, and politician who is an Alliance Party Member of the Legislative Assembly (MLA). She was elected as an MLA in the 2022 Northern Ireland Assembly election for North Antrim.

Political career

Early career  
In 2016, as part of the Washington-Ireland Program, O'Lynn worked as a congressional intern for U.S. Senator John McCain.

O'Lynn ran as the Alliance Party candidate for North Antrim in the 2017 Northern Ireland Assembly election, but was unsuccessful. O'Lynn was encouraged to join Alliance and run as a candidate by Kate Nicholl, then an Alliance councillor on Belfast City Council. She was an Alliance candidate again later that year, this time for the 2017 UK general election, running in North Antrim. She came fifth, with 2,723 votes, maintaining Alliance's percentage share of the vote from the previous general election.

O'Lynn then served as a councillor, representing Ballymena, in Mid and East Antrim Borough Council. She was elected at the 2019 local elections, gaining a seat from the DUP.

Later that year, at the 2019 general election, O'Lynn was again the Alliance candidate for the parliamentary constituency of North Antrim. She polled 6,231 votes, taking third place, and increased her share of the vote by 8.5%.

From April 2021 to October 2021, O'Lynn served as a special adviser to Justice Minister Naomi Long while Long's other special adviser Claire Johnson was on maternity leave.

Member of the Legislative Assembly 
On 7 May 2022, O'Lynn was elected as the first ever Alliance MLA and the first woman to represent North Antrim in the Northern Ireland Assembly. She was elected on the sixth stage of the count, defeating incumbent DUP MLA Mervyn Storey by a margin of 288 votes - the third tightest margin of victory in Northern Ireland. Her election was considered an upset in the staunchly unionist constituency of North Antrim with BelfastLive describing it as a "seismic shift". In her victory speech, O'Lynn said that the "age of entitlement is over" for DUP dominance in the constituency. Jim Allister, on the other hand, said that Mervyn Storey's loss was a "matter of great sadness to me that his seat has been taken by the crypto-nationalist Alliance Party".

In 2022, O'Lynn announced that she would resign from Stormont on 31 March to take up a job at Queen's University Belfast.

Personal life 
In 2021, O'Lynn completed doctoral research at Queen’s University Belfast. Her doctoral thesis was titled 'Mainstreams, Margins and the Spaces In-Between: Youth Experiences of School Exclusion in Northern Ireland' and focused on young people’s experiences of exclusion from school within Northern Ireland. She also received the Sir Tomas Dixon Award and the Department for Economy doctoral scholarship. O'Lynn officially graduated from Queen's University Belfast with a PhD on 2 July 2022.

Academic works

References

External links 

Living people
Alliance Party of Northern Ireland MLAs
Northern Ireland MLAs 2022–2027
Alumni of Queen's University Belfast
Alliance Party of Northern Ireland councillors
Women councillors in Northern Ireland
Female members of the Northern Ireland Assembly
Politicians from County Antrim
21st-century women politicians from Northern Ireland
1990 births